O'Neal Phillip Tutein (February 26, 1943 – October 7, 2010) was an American football coach.  He served as the head football coach at Fordham University from 1981 to 1985, 20–32, compiled a record of 20–32.

Tutein attended George W. Wingate High School in Brooklyn, New York and Central State University in Wilberforce, Ohio.  He played college football as a tight end at Central State.  Tutein was working at the Albert Einstein College of Medicine in 1969 at director of rehabilitation when he began coaching football at the nearby Evander Childs High School.  He served as an assistant football coach at Columbia University from 1974 to 1980 under head coaches William Campbell and Bob Naso.

Tutein died in 2010, in Lutz, Florida, where he lived.

Head coaching record

References

1943 births
2010 deaths
American football tight ends
Central State Marauders football players
Columbia Lions football coaches
Fordham Rams football coaches
High school football coaches in New York (state)
Sportspeople from Brooklyn
Players of American football from New York City
People from Lutz, Florida
Players of American football from New York (state)
African-American coaches of American football
African-American players of American football
20th-century African-American sportspeople
21st-century African-American people